Jamboree is the second album by American indie rock band Beat Happening, released in 1988 through K Records and Rough Trade Records. All songs were produced by Steve Fisk with assistance from Screaming Trees members Mark Lanegan and Gary Lee Conner (who plays a brief guitar solo on "Midnight a Go-Go"), except "Cat Walk," produced by Patrick Maley, and "The This Many Boyfriends Club," recorded live by Rich Jensen.

Content
The album marks a darker approach to the twee pop for which the band is known, due largely to a increased use of guitar distortion, more professional production, and increased emphasis on Calvin Johnson's deep voice than in the group's earlier recordings. The majority of the songs are sung by Calvin Johnson, while Heather Lewis only provides vocals on two songs, the uncharacteristically brash "In Between" and the more typically understated "Ask Me." At the time of the album's release, Johnson described Jamborees sound as "dark and sexy." Still, the band retained their emphasis on exuberance over musicianship, as Bret Lunsford stated in an interview that, while recording album opener "Bewitched," his guitar string got stuck on a protruding screw and he continued to play through the song, hitting the string a bit harder until it became unstuck.

Reception
Two tracks from Jamboree, "Bewitched" and "Indian Summer," were listed as essential listening in Pitchforks 2005 article on twee pop entitled "Twee as Fuck."  "Indian Summer" is perhaps the group's best-known song, as it was famously covered by dream pop group Luna, whose lead singer, Dean Wareham, joked in The Shield Around the K: The Story of K Records, a documentary film on the history of Johnson's K Records, that the song was "indie's 'Knocking on Heaven's Door'-- everybody's done it." The song was also covered by Ben Gibbard for the soundtrack to the Kurt Cobain documentary About a Son; Jamboree was reportedly one of Cobain's favorite albums. AllMusic said of the album: "...each cut is a marvel of innocence and ingenuity."

Track listing
All tracks were written by Beat Happening.

References

Beat Happening albums
K Records albums
Albums produced by Steve Fisk
1988 albums